Kohlu or Kahloo or Koholu in Iran, may refer to:
 Kohlu-ye Olya
 Kohlu-ye Sofla